Vladimir Ivanovich Nemirovich-Danchenko (Ozurgeti – 25 April 1943, Moscow), was a Soviet and Russian theatre director, writer, pedagogue, playwright, producer and theatre administrator, who founded the Moscow Art Theatre with his colleague, Konstantin Stanislavski, in 1898.

Biography
Vladimir Ivanovich Nemirovich-Danchenko was born into a Russian noble family of mixed Ukrainian-Armenian descent, in the village of Shemokmedi near Ozurgeti (Guria, Georgia). His father, Ivan Danchenko, was an officer in the Imperial Russian army, and his mother, Aleksandra Yagubyan (1829–1914), was Armenian from the Governorate of Tiflis. He went to high school in Tbilisi, continuing his education at Moscow State University (physical-mathematical and juridical departments 1876–79).

In 1879 he left the university for the theatre, starting as a theatre critic, and in 1881, his first play "Dog-rose", which was staged in one year by Maly Theatre, was published. He was a teacher of Ivan Moskvin, Olga Knipper and Vsevolod Meyerhold.

In 1919, he established the Musical Theatre of the Moscow Art Theatre, which was reformed into the Nemirovich-Danchenko Musical Theatre in 1926. In 1943 Nemirovich-Danchenko established the Moscow Art Theatre School, which is still extant.

He died of a heart attack on 25 April 1943, aged 84, in Moscow.

Legacy
Nemirovich-Danchenko's Moscow Art Theatre staged Chekhov and Gorky drama with theretofore unknown naturalism and full expression. In addition, his theatre presented highly acclaimed Dostoevsky and Tolstoy dramatizations. It has been said  that "If Stanislavski was the soul of Art Theatre, then Nemirovich was its heart".

Nemirovich-Danchenko created the Moscow Art Theatre's acting and directing style, known for "actors ensemble" and its "atmosphere". Because of his directorial and production skills, the Moscow Art Theatre was considered, at the time, the best theatre in the Soviet Union. But Nemirovich didn't write down his acting "system" and we know only the "system of Stanislavski". He was one of the first recipients of the title of People's Artist of the USSR in 1936. Later, he was awarded the Order of Lenin (3 May 1937) and the Stalin Prize (1942, 1943).

Productions
The Brothers Karamazov (1910) 
Resurrection (1930)
Anna Karenina (1937)
Three Sisters (1940)

References

External links

 Vladimir Nemirovich-Danchenko: Biography from Answers.com

1858 births
1943 deaths
19th-century theatre
20th-century theatre
People from Guria
People from Kutais Governorate
People from Ozurgeti
Moscow Art Theatre
Moscow State University alumni
People's Artists of the RSFSR
People's Artists of the USSR
Stalin Prize winners
Recipients of the Order of Lenin
Recipients of the Order of the Red Banner of Labour
Georgian people of Armenian descent
Georgian people of Ukrainian descent
Russian opera directors
Russian theatre critics
Russian theatre directors
Soviet theatre critics
Soviet theatre directors
Burials at Novodevichy Cemetery